Michelle Williams is an American actress who has received various awards and nominations, including two Golden Globe Awards, a Primetime Emmy Award and two Critics' Choice Awards. Additionally, she has been nominated for five Academy Awards, four BAFTA Awards, and a Tony Award

Major associations

Academy Awards
The Academy Awards are a set of awards given by the Academy of Motion Picture Arts and Sciences annually for excellence of cinematic achievements.

BAFTA Awards
The British Academy Film Awards is an annual award show presented by the British Academy of Film and Television Arts.

Emmy Awards
The Primetime Emmy Awards are presented annually by the Academy of Television Arts & Sciences, also known as the Television Academy, to recognize and honor achievements in the television industry.

Golden Globe Awards
The Golden Globe Awards are accolades bestowed by the 93 members of the Hollywood Foreign Press Association (HFPA) recognizing excellence in film and television, both domestic and foreign.

Screen Actors Guild Awards
The Screen Actors Guild Awards are organized by the Screen Actors Guild‐American Federation of Television and Radio Artists. First awarded in 1995, the awards aim to recognize excellent achievements in film and television.

Tony Awards
The Antoinette Perry Award for Excellence in Broadway Theatre, more commonly known as the Tony Award, recognizes excellence in live Broadway theatre. The awards are presented by the American Theatre Wing and The Broadway League at an annual ceremony in New York City.

Other awards and nominations

AACTA Awards
The AACTA Awards, are presented annually by the Australian Academy of Cinema and Television Arts (AACTA). The awards recognize excellence of professionals in the film and television industry, including the producers, directors, actors, writers, and cinematographers. It is the most prestigious awards ceremony for the Australian film and television industry.

Academy of Canadian Cinema and Television Awards
The Academy of Canadian Cinema & Television is a Canadian non-profit organization created in 1979 to recognize over 4,000 Canadian film industry and television industry professionals. As of 2012, the academy's primary national awards program is the Canadian Screen Awards, which were announced in 2012 as a replacement for the formerly distinct Genie Award and Gemini Award ceremonies.

Critics' Choice Movie Awards
The Critics' Choice Movie Awards are presented annually since 1995 by the Broadcast Film Critics Association for outstanding achievements in the cinema industry.

Critics' Choice Television Awards
The Critics' Choice Television Awards are presented annually since 2011 by the Broadcast Television Journalists Association for outstanding achievements in the television industry.

Gotham Awards
Presented by the Independent Filmmaker Project, the Gotham Awards award the best in independent film.

Hollywood Film Festival
The Hollywood Film Awards are held annually to recognize talent in the film industry.

Independent Spirit Awards
The Independent Spirit Awards are presented annually by Film Independent, to award best in the independent film community.

MTV Movie and TV Awards
The MTV Movie & TV Awards is an annual award show presented by MTV to honor outstanding achievements in films. Founded in 1992, the winners of the awards are decided online by the audience.

Satellite Awards 
The Satellite Awards are a set of annual awards given by the International Press Academy.

Television Critics Association Awards
The TCA Awards are awards presented by the Television Critics Association in recognition of excellence in television.

Teen Choice Awards
The Teen Choice Awards is an annual awards show that airs on the Fox television network. The awards honor the year's biggest achievements in music, film, sports, television, fashion, and more, voted by viewers aged 11 to 20.

Young Artist Awards
The Young Artist Award is an accolade bestowed by the Young Artist Association, a non-profit organization founded in 1978 to honor excellence of youth performers.

Critics associations and other awards

References

Williams, Michelle